Said Amour Arfi (born 9 February 1952) is a Tanzanian CCM politician and was a Member of Parliament for Mpanda Town constituency since 2005 to 2015.

On 5 July 2015, he announced that he would be leaving the Chadema party as soon as the 10th Parliament is dissolved. He also emphasized that he was certain the constituency would be won by the ruling Chama Cha Mapinduzi in the 2015 election.

References

1952 births
Living people
Chadema MPs
Chama Cha Mapinduzi politicians
Tanzanian MPs 2010–2015